This is a list of female artistic gymnasts currently competing internationally for their federation. To appear on this list, a gymnast must be active and a member of her country's national team or have a FIG Licence.

Gymnasts are listed under their country and are alphabetized by primary surname.

A

Fatma Zohra Boukhatem
Sihem Hamidi
Ahlem Mokhtari
Sofia Nair
Lahna Salem
Rihab Sidra Sedhane
Chama Temmami

Isabella Ajalla
Morena Aranda
Ana Arosteguy
Trinidad Bottiglieri
Brisa Carraro
Ambar Centurion
Mia Corrente
Milagros Curti Ruiz
Lara Demarsico
Magdalena Gaido
Aylen Gasparri
Nicole Iribarne
Catalina Llalen Gavi
Sira Macias
Abigail Magistrati
Mia Mainardi
Leila Martinez
Meline Mesropian
Tiziana Olivetto Kosinski
Felicitas Palmou
Romina Pietrantuono
Zoe Salgado
Rocio Saucedo
Mia Suaya

Marieta Buchakhchyan
Anna Grigoryan
Mane Poghosyan

Amika Every
Ashley Provence
Jayly-Ann Wester

Georgia-Rose Brown
Miella Brown
Romi Brown
Ava Costa
Sumer Daly
Olena Edmeades
Amanda Edwards
Georgia Godwin
Kiersten Hashimoto Kougiadis
Kate McDonald
Emma Nedov
Tiana Odessa
Ruby Pass
Macy Pegoil
Chloe Saliaris
Kate Sayer
Breanna Scott
Charlotte Shin
Lucy Stewart
Emily Whitehead

Miriam Bernhard
Lorena Boehmberger
Leni Bohle
Linda Chai
Valentina Frint
Bianca Frysak
Katharina Gschiel
Elisa Haemmerle
Selina Kickinger
Jaqueline Kostelac
Carina Kroell
Jasmin Mader
Marlies Maennersdorfer
Alissa Moerz
Charlize Moerz
Collien Moerz
Katrin Palicka
Lilia Rief
Berta Schwaninger
Nicol Wimmer
Aurea Wutschka

Daniz Aliyeva
Samira Gahramanova
Nazrin Humbatova
Duyghu Majidzade
Aytan Mammadova
Milena Minakovskaya
Maryam Musayeva
Nazanin Teymurova

B

Olivia Kelly
Erin Pinder

Anastasiya Alistratava
Yuliya Lukhatan
Dziyana Pilavets
Lizaveta Pulukchu
Adelina Rylko
Anastasiya Smantsar

Stacy Bertrandt
Maellyse Brassart
Margaux Daveloose
Senna Deriks
Nina Derwael
Fien Enghels
Axelle Klinckaert
Noémie Louon
Lisa Vaelen
Julie Vandamme
Jade Vansteenkiste

Mia Anez Bruun
Ariana Aranibar Rodriguez
Camila Heredia Glasinovic
Analia Ibanez Moreno
Rafaela Mendoza Berzain
Zafira Montalvan Munoz
Luciana Unzueta Hurtado
Diana Vasquez

Rebeca Andrade
Jade Barbosa
Christal Bezerra
Thaís Fidélis
Ana Luiza Lima
Lorrane Oliveira
Carolyne Pedro
Anna Julia Reis
Flávia Saraiva
Júlia Soares

Greta Banishka
Laney Madsen
Raya Ranchova

C



Senior 
Ellie Black
Laurie Denommée
Jessica Dowling
Cassie Lee
Sophie Marois
Shallon Olsen
Clara Raposo
Rachael Riley
Audrey Rousseau
Quinn Skrupa
Emma Spence
Ava Stewart
Leah Tindale
Sydney Turner
Rose-Kaying Woo
Maya Zonneveld

Junior 
Rébéka Groulx
Bailey Inglis

Raegan Rutty

Martina Castro
Simona Castro
María del Sol Pérez
Makarena Pinto
Franchesca Santi



Senior
Chen Yile
Fan Yilin
Li Qi
Liu Jieyu
Liu Jingxing
Liu Jinru
Liu Tingting
Lu Yufei
Luo Huan
Lyu Jiaqi
Qi Qi
Tang Xijing
Yu Linmin
Zhang Jin
Zhao Shiting

Junior
Guan Chenchen
Wei Xiaoyuan

Chuang Hsiu-Ju
Fang Ko-Ching
Fu Chih-Yi
Lai Pin-Ju
Ting Hua-Tien
Wu Sing-Fen

Angelica Mesa
Valentina Pardo
Nataly Rodríguez
María Villegas

Luciana Alvarado
Mariana Andrade
Arianna Castaneda
Camila Montoya
Mariangeles Murillo
Heika del Sol Salas

Ana Đerek
Petra Furač
Ema Kajić
Tijana Tkalčec
Christina Zwicker

Yesenia Ferrera
Yumila Rodríguez
Marcia Videaux

Gloria Philassides
Anastasia Theocharous



Senior
Kristýna Brabcová
Eliška Fiřtová
Sabina Hálová
Jasmína Hnilicová
Aneta Holasová
Lucie Jiříková
Marie Nevrklová
Dominika Ponížilová
Anna Yeates

Junior
Natálie Brabcová
Marta Fraňková
Daniela Hálová
Tamara Kalašová
Nela Tereza Kaplanová
Magdaléna Coufalová
Lucie Maříková
Eliška Ottová
Arleta Pražáková
Sára Procházková
Aneta Škubalová
Nela Štěpandová
Lucie Trnková

D

Sofia Bjørnholdt
Victoria Gilberg
Victoria Kajø
Camille Rasmussen
Linnea Wang
Emilie Winther

Camil Betances
Sandra Contreras
Yamilet Peña

E

Giulianna Pino

Nour El Mahdawy
Farah Hussein
Zeina Ibrahim
Hana Kassem
Mandy Mohamed
Farah Salem
Nancy Taman

Alexa Grande
Paola Ruano

F

Ada Hautala
Enni Kettunen
Maija Leinonen
Sani Mäkelä
Nitta Nieminen
Rosanna Ojala
Siiri Saukkonen
Annika Urvikko

Aglaé Adam-Cuvillier
Marine Boyer
Lorette Charpy
Mélanie De Jesus Dos Santos
Coline Devillard
Maewenn Eugene
Maëlys Eugene
Alison Faure
Julia Forestier
Aline Friess
Elise Garcia
Lucie Henna
Carolann Héduit
Alizée Letrange - Mouakit
Morgane Osyssek
Sheyen Petit
Claire Pontlevoy
Célia Serber
Salsabil Tounan
Mathilde Wahl

G

Ani Gobadze
Maria Kharenkova



Senior
Tabea Alt
Leah Grießer
Emma Höfele
Leonie Papke
Emelie Petz
Kim Ruoff
Pauline Schäfer
Sophie Scheder
Elisabeth Seitz
Isabelle Stingl
Michelle Timm
Sarah Voss
Lisa Zimmermann

Junior
Marielle Billet
Julia Birck
Salina Bousmayo
Julia Helen Dumrath
Finia Friedländer
Theresa Geyer
Jasmin Haase
Lona Häcker
Lara Hinsberger
Anna-Lena König
Michelle Kunz
Emma Malewski
Pia Meier
Lucia Meyer
Lea Quaas
Klara Quach
Maya Reichwald
Catalina Santos-Moran Diaz
Paula Vega Tarrago
Aiyu Zhu

Ondine Achampong
Shannon Archer
Rosie Bayliss
Poppy Blair
Emily Bremner
Megan Bridge
Ellie Cornforth
Erin Cozens
Grace Davies
Lily Davis
Mabelle Dawson
Jessica Daykin
Madeleine Dodd
Chloe Donnelly
Tara Donnelly
Elissa Downie
Rebecca Downie
Ruby Evan
Mia Evans
Georgia-Mae Fenton
Evie Flage-Donovan
Claudia Fragapane
Ebony Gaddum
Jennifer Gadirova
Jessica Gadirova
Sophie Goodman
Eilidh Gorrell
Taeja James
Keyanna John-Lewis
Aaliyah Kalume
Ema Kandalova
Cara Kennedy
Alice Kinsella
Crystelle Lake
Aaliyah Manning
Daisy Mappleback
Jea Maracha
Abigail Martin
Sofia Micallef
Amelie Morgan
Mali Morgan
Billie Netherton
Madison Nicol
Georgia Price
Isabelle Priestley
Bethany Rayment
Grace Roberts
Sonia Runcianu
Kelly Simm
Ruby Stacey
Poppy-Grace Sticker
Elisha Stott
Emily Thomas
Tiegan Trafford
Lucy Worthington
Annie Young

Argyro Afrati
Elvira Katsali
Evelina Maja
Evangelia Monokrousou
Magdalini Tsiori
Ioanna Xoulogi

Marcela Bonifasi
Kimberly del Valle
Ana Palacios

H

Elizabeth Chan
Ng Yan Yin

Csenge Bácskay
Dorina Böczögő
Zsófia Kovács
Mirtill Makovits
Noémi Makra
Sára Péter
Bianka Schermann
Zója Székely
Hanna Szujó

I

Thelma Adalsteinsdóttir
Birta Alexandersdóttir
Dominiqua Belányi
Margrét Kristinsdóttir
Sonja Ólafsdóttir
Andrea Orradóttir
Vigdís Pálmadóttir
Irina Sazonova
Emilia Sigurjonsdóttir

Aruna Budda Reddy
Pranati Das
Dipa Karmakar
Pranati Nayak
Shraddha Talekar

Tazsa Devira
Amalia Fauziah
Rifda Irfanaluthfi
Trithalia

Jane Heffernan
Kate Molloy
Megan Ryan
Emma Slevin
Meaghan Smith

Tzuf Feldon
Gaya Giladi
Meitar Lavy
Ofir Netzer
Lihie Raz

Martina Basile
Desirée Carofiglio
Alice D'Amato
Asia D'Amato
Vanessa Ferrari
Giada Grisetti
Elisa Iorio
Irene Lanza
Francesca Linari
Martina Maggio
Veronica Mandriota
Micol Minotti
Lara Mori
Sara Ricciardi
Martina Rizzelli
Giorgia Villa
Chiara Vincenzi

J

Kiara Richmon

Ashikawa Urara
Fukasawa Kokoro
Hanawa Soyoka
Hatakeda Chiaki
Hatakeda Hitomi
Kajita Nagi
Kuwajima Kiko
Matsumura Akari
Ogawa Asuka
Oguchi Mana
Sakaguchi Ayaka
Sugihara Aiko
Teramoto Asuka
Uchiyama Yuki
Yamada Chiharu
Yumoto Sakura
Yumoto Yurika

Ruba Al-Daoud

K

Valeza Rama

Aida Bauyrzhanova
Yekaterina Chuikina
Arailym Meiram

L

Alina Circene
Anastasija Dubova
Zane Petrova
Marija Ribalcenko
Elina Vihrova

Ula Bikinaite
Ema Pleskyte
Agata Vostruchovaite

Celeste Mordenti

M

Farah Ann Abdul Hadi
Tan Ing Yueh
Ang Tracie
Rachel Yeoh Li Wen

Leah Barber
Elena Bondin
Ella Borg
Philippa Busuttil
Isabel Camilleri
Faith Cassar Fenech
Lyana Curmi Inguanez
Phoebe Fenech
Rihanna Fishley Sullivan
Tara Vella Clark

Daniela Briceño
Paulina Campos
Nicolle Castro
Frida Esparza
Elsa García
Anapaula Gutiérrez
Jimena Gutiérrez
Ana Lago
Victoria Mata
Alexa Moreno
Paula Murillo

Nisrine Aabab
Imane Balad
Chorouk Elannabi
Rim El Yaagoubi
Nisrine Hassanaine
Ines Laabourri
Yasmine Laabourri
Sofia Maadani
Rihab Sobti
Salma Tougui

N

Laura de Witt
Elisabeth Geurts
Marit Reijnders
Kirsten Polderman
Eythora Thorsdottir
Mara Titarsolej
Sara van Disseldorp
Vera van Pol
Lisa van Rozen
Sanna Veerman
Naomi Visser
Tisha Volleman
Lieke Wevers
Sanne Wevers

Isabella Brett
Maia Fishwick
Courtney McGregor

Annabel Agba
Amenaghawon Melvin

An Chang-ok
Kim Son-hyang
Kim Su-jong
Kim Won-yong
Pyon Rye-yong
Ri Su-ryon

Sara Davidsen
Julie Erichsen
Edel Fosse
Ingrid Hafenbrädl
Selma Halvorsen
Nora Irgens
Mari Kanter
Thea Nygaard
Julie Søderstrøm
Juliane Tøssebro
Maria Tronrud

P

Sandra Collantes
Fabiola Díaz
Ana Karina Mendez
Ariana Orrego

Corinne Bunagan

Wiktoria Giemza
Gabriela Janik
Wiktoria Łopuszańska
Marta Pihan-Kulesza
Dagmara Pyzio
Isabel Sikon

Beatriz Cardoso
Beatriz Dias
Rafaela Ferreira
Mariana Marianito
Ana Filipa Martins
Mariana Pitrez

Sydney Barros
Karelys Díaz
Nicole Díaz
Bianca León
Andrea Maldonado
Paula Mejías

Q

Duha Al-Habshi

R



Senior
Iulia Berar
Ioana Crișan
Carmen Ghiciuc
Maria Holbură
Larisa Iordache
Alexandra Mihai
Maria Pană
Ana Maria Puiu

Junior
Antonia Duta
Lisa Marchidanu
Silviana Sfiringu
Ioana Stănciulescu
Daniela Trică



Senior Main Team
Anastasia Agafonova
Lilia Akhaimova
Daria Belousova
Elena Gerasimova
Viktoria Gorbatova
Anastasia Ilyankova
Viktoria Listunova
Angelina Melnikova
Maria Minaeva
Uliana Perebinosova
Arina Semukhina
Aleksandra Shchekoldina
Angelina Simakova
Vladislava Urazova
Yana Vorona

Junior
Ekaterina Andreeva
Liubov Galiuzhina
Anna Kalmykova
Elizaveta Karelova
Diana Kustova
Liudmila Roshchina
Valeriia Seliutina
Elizaveta Us
Leila Vasileva

S

Anđela Đurđević
Aleksandra Rajčić
Jelena Stamenković
Kristina Živadinović

Nadine Joy Nathan
Tamara Anika Ong
Shayne Tan
Sze En Tan

Radoslava Kalamárová
Ema Kuklovská
Barbora Mokošová
Kristína Pýchová
Karolina Takáčová
Veronika Valaštiaková
Viktória Vydureková

Teja Belak
Lucija Hribar
Tjaša Kysselef
Adela Šajn
Gaja Zabnikar

Tamsyn Bessit
Claudia Cummins
Naveen Daries
Mammule Rankoe
Caitlin Rooskrantz

Eom Do-hyun
Ham Mi-ju
Kim Ju-ry
Lee Eun-ju
Lee Yun-seo
Yeo Seo-jeong
Yun Na-rae

Alba Asencio
Laura Bechdejú
Andrea Carmona
Emma Fernández
Marina González
Lorena Medina
Ana Pérez
Alba Petisco
Roxana Popa
Paula Raya

Milka Gehani

Jonna Adlerteg
Jessica Castles
Tonya Paulsson
Marcela Torres
Izabella Trejo



Senior
Caterina Barloggio
Lena Bickel
Thea Brogli
Nina Ferrazzini
Agathe Germann
Alessia Gresser
Lilli Habisreutinger
Ilaria Käslin
Leonie Meier
Alessia Pagnamenta
Anastassia Pascu
Livia Schmid
Stefanie Siegenthaler
Nadina Spiess
Lou Steffen
Fabienne Studer
Anina Wildi
Anny Wu

Junior
Chiara Léonie Altorfer
Martina Eisenegger
Corina Erdin
Chiara Giubellini
Clémence Gobet
Daria Angelina Hartmann
Yuki Mangold
Aimée Meyer
Sarina Stulz

Areej Al-Khayat

T

Chahed Sakr

Doğa Ketenci
Ekin Morova
Demet Mutlu
Doğa Özgöçmez
Ilayda Şahin
Nazlı Savranbaşı
Göksu Üçtaş
Ezgi Yeşil
Dilara Yurtdaş

U

Anastasiia Bachynska
Yana Fedorova
Anastasiia Motak
Daria Murzhak
Valeriia Osipova
Angelina Radivilova
Alona Titarenko
Diana Varinska



Senior
 Ciena Alipio
 Simone Biles
 Skye Blakely
 Charlotte Booth
 Jade Carey
 Jordan Chiles
 Kailin Chio
 Kayla DiCello
 Amari Drayton
 Kara Eaker
 Addison Fatta
 eMjae Frazier
 Olivia Greaves
 Shilese Jones
 Katelyn Jong
 Emily Lee
 Sunisa Lee
 Kaliya Lincoln
 Emma Malabuyo
 Grace McCallum
 Konnor McClain
 Riley McCusker
 Zoe Miller
 Joscelyn Roberson
 Ava Siegfeldt
 Leanne Wong

Junior

 Madray Johnson
 Avery King
 Myli Lew
 Ella Murphy
 Ella Kate Parker
 Hezly Rivera
 Tiana Sumanasekera
 Gabby Van Frayen

Pierina Cedres

Oksana Chusovitina
Ominakhon Khalilova
Sabina Turobova
Indira Ulmasova

V

Milca León
Katriel Sousa

Đỗ Thị Vân Anh
Tienna Nguyen
Phạm Như Phương
Trần Đoàn Quỳnh Nam

References 

Female artistic gymnasts
Lists of female gymnasts
female artistic gymnasts